Cyperus breviculmis is a sedge of the family Cyperaceae that is native to parts of northern Australia.

The plant blooms between April and August producing green-brown flowers.

In Western Australia it is found around swamps in the Kimberley region where it grows in red-brown permanently damp clay soils. It is also found in the Northern Territory and Queensland.

See also
List of Cyperus species

References

Plants described in 1810
Flora of Western Australia
breviculmis
Taxa named by Robert Brown (botanist, born 1773)
Flora of the Northern Territory
Flora of Queensland